A travel warning, travel alert, or travel advisory is an official warning statement issued by government agencies to provide information about the relative safety of travelling to or visiting one or more specific foreign countries or destinations. The purpose is to enable travelers to make an informed decision about a particular travel destination, and to help travellers prepare adequately for what may be encountered on their trip. In the United States, travel warnings are issued by the Department of State and are often called warden messages.

Travel advisories may relate to issues such as inclement weather, security matters, civil unrest or disease.

Countries issuing warnings

The following countries regularly publish travel warnings to their citizens:
Australia
Austria
Belgium
Bulgaria
Canada (Canadian citizens can register in an online list before traveling abroad.)
Croatia
Cyprus
Czech Republic
Denmark
Estonia
Finland
France
Germany (German citizens can register in an online list before traveling abroad.)
Hong Kong
Hungary
India
Indonesia
Ireland
Israel
Italy
Japan
Latvia
Lithuania
Luxembourg
Malta
Mexico
Netherlands
New Zealand
Norway
Poland
Romania
Singapore
Slovakia
South Korea
Spain
Sweden
Switzerland (Swiss citizens can register in an online list before traveling abroad. Registered persons will get a message if the situation in their destination country changes for the worse.)
Taiwan
Turkey (Turkish citizens can also directly reach to Turkish diplomatic missions in the country they are visiting via phone in case of an emergency.)
United Kingdom
United States

Notes

References 

 
 
 

Travel
International relations